The 2015 Christy Ring Cup was the eleventh staging of the Christy Ring Cup hurling championship since its establishment by the Gaelic Athletic Association in 2005. The cup competition began on 2 May 2015 and ended on 6 June 2014.

Kildare were the defending champions, however, they were beaten in the semi-final. Kerry won the title after defeating Derry by 1-20 to 0-12 in the final.	

Mayo were relegated from the Christy Ring Cup after losing a play-off with Roscommon.

Format

The 2015 Christy Ring Cup is played in a double-elimination format. For clarity, the draw details are explained in each round below.

Round 1

All eight teams play in four matches.

Round 2

Round 2A

Contested by four winners from round 1

Round 2B

Contested by four losers from round 1

Quarter-finals

Winners of round 2B versus losers of round 2A in two games referred to as quarter finals.

Semi-finals

Winners of round 2A versus winners of the two quarter-finals

Final

The winners of this year's Christy Ring Final are automatically promoted to play in the Qualifier Group of next year's Leinster Championship.

Christy Ring/Nicky Rackard Relegation/Promotion

Play-off

Contested by two losers from round 2B

Relegation/Promotion play-off

The bottom team in this year's Christy Ring Cup plays the winner of this year's Nicky Rackard Cup.

Top scorers

Overall

Single game

External links
 2015 Christy Ring Cup fixtures and results

References

Christy Ring Cup
Christy Ring Cup